Roy Waage (born 17 November 1963) is a Norwegian politician for the Coastal Party, the current mayor of Skjervøy.

He was originally a member of the Christian Democrats, serving as a deputy representative to the Norwegian Parliament from Troms during the term 1997–2001.

He switched to the Coastal Party after it was created in the late 1999. He was top candidate for the party in Troms in the 2001 election but marginally failed to get elected. In the 2003 local elections he was elected member for the Troms county council and re-elected mayor of Skjervøy, something he has been since 1995.

On 13 March 2005 he was appointed chairman of the party, a position he held until 1 May 2007. The party failed to get legislative representation in the 2005 election, but Waage was again re-elected mayor of Skjervøy in the 2007 local elections.

References

1963 births
Living people
Christian Democratic Party (Norway) politicians
Deputy members of the Storting
Coastal Party politicians
Mayors of places in Troms
Place of birth missing (living people)